An astronomical body collided with Jupiter, the largest planet in the Solar System, on March 17, 2016. The object in question has not been confirmed by NASA to be an asteroid or comet, but may be so.

Evidence
A video was taken of Jupiter in Mödling on March 17 by an amateur astronomer, Gerrit Kernbauer, with a 20 centimeter telescope. During his filming, a light appeared on the right side of Jupiter as viewed from his lens. Another amateur astronomer, John McKeon, posted a video shot using an 11-inch telescope and an infrared filter of the same event, verifying the clip that Kernbauer had posted.
 
The manager of the NASA NEO Program Office at NASA's Jet Propulsion Laboratory Paul Chodas said that there was a greater possibility of the object being an asteroid rather than a comet.

See also 
 Impact events on Jupiter

References

Jupiter
Jupiter impact events